Whose Line is it Anyway? (shortened to Whose Line? or WLIIA) is a short-form improvisational comedy television series created by Dan Patterson and Mark Leveson, presented by Clive Anderson, and produced for Channel 4 between 23 September 1988 and 4 February 1999. The programme's format was on a panel of four performers conducting a series of short-form improvisation games, creating comedic scenes per pre-determined situations made by the host or from suggestions by the audience. Such games include creating sound effects, performing a scene to different television and film styles, using props, and making up a song on the spot. The programme originally began as a short-lived BBC radio programme, before the concept was adapted for television.

During its history, the programme featured a variety of noted comedians from Britain, Canada and the United States. While initial series were frequented with performances by John Sessions, Stephen Fry, Paul Merton, Mike McShane, and Josie Lawrence, its popularity grew with the introduction of Ryan Stiles and Colin Mochrie, who became firm regulars towards the later series. The programme itself was mainly recorded in Britain, though two series had some episodes made in New York, and its final series was shot entirely in California before the programme was cancelled due to falling viewing figures.

The success of Whose Line? spawned several domestic and international adaptations. An American version aired on ABC between 1998 and 2007 and was revived on The CW in 2013, and is broadcast in multiple countries. Whose Line Is It Anyway? Australia debuted on The Comedy Channel in 2016. Two similarly-themed British comedy programmes, Mock the Week (2005) and Fast and Loose (2011), were created by Patterson.

History 

In 1988, Dan Patterson and Mark Leveson approached the BBC with a concept for a new comedy programme, involving a group of performers conducting games that encompassed improvisational comedy. The title of their concept was a comedic riposte to the radio programme What's My Line, which had recently moved to a television format, merged to the title of a 1972 play, Whose Life Is It Anyway?. Their pitch was well liked by the broadcaster, who green-lighted a radio programme for broadcast on BBC Radio 4, commissioning six episodes. Both Patterson and Leveson opted for it to be presented by Clive Anderson, with both John Sessions and Stephen Fry joining him as regular performers in each episode, and music being provided by Colin Sell.

After the radio series came to an end, Patterson and Leveson began discussions with the BBC on creating a televised adaption of their concept. However, the broadcaster was hesitant on making the move, leading to the pair being approached by Channel 4, who eagerly liked the idea, and securing a deal from the producers to bring the programme to their channel. The move to television was initially hit with a problem, as while it was desired for the regular cast to appear on the first televised series, Fry had begun to dislike conducting improvisational comedy. The matter was resolved by allowing him to pull out, with Sessions convinced by Fry to remain as a regular performer for the first series. In addition, Sell was unable to perform on the programme, resulting in Richard Vranch  - a member of improvisational group, The Comedy Store Players, based at London's Comedy Store - becoming the resident musician for much of the programme's broadcast.

Whose Line proved a success when aired on Channel 4, effectively helping to boost the careers of some of its regular performers that appeared during early episodes, including several members from The Comedy Store Players - these included Paul Merton, Josie Lawrence and Sandi Toksvig. At times, the programme also featured a number of celebrities who made occasional appearances during the earlier series, such as Peter Cook, George Wendt, and Jonathan Pryce. While the programme drew from the talent of British comedians, it also expanded to recruiting those from the United States; comedians such as Greg Proops and Mike McShane added considerably to performances, with some episodes in the third and fourth series filmed entirely within New York and thus drawing talent purely from American performers. By the fifth series, several regular performers discontinued their involvement, yet the show was greatly enhanced by the involvement of fresh talent by this time - British comedian Tony Slattery, American comedian Ryan Stiles, and Canadian comedian Colin Mochrie, improved the reputation of the programme and provided more diverse comedy and favorable viewing figures, effectively becoming prominent regulars in episodes.

As series progressed, the viewing figures of Whose Line began to drop after reaching the peak of its popularity following the sixth series. Part of the problem was due to the constant use of regular performers, including Stiles and Mochrie, leaving little room for new talent to be showcased on the programme, with figures diminishing further by the departure of Slattery after the eighth series. By the tenth series, the programme fundamentally was filmed within Hollywood, California, and featured mainly American talent, such as comedian Wayne Brady, with Vranch replaced by Laura Hall as the in-house musician. However, after the broadcast of its final episode in February 1999, Channel 4 decided to axe the programme following the eventual slump in the show's viewing figures. Repeats of Whose Line continued following its cancellation, though with episodes edited and reformatted as a result.

Format 
Most television episodes of Whose Line Is It Anyway? featured four performers (with an exception of six in a 1989 Christmas special) who sit in a line of chairs at the back of the stage. The host sat at a desk facing the large performance area in front of the performers. The host introduced each performer with a joke or pun, usually all related on a common theme or topic.

The show is made up of games that are scored by the host, who declared arbitrary point values after the game, often citing a humorous reason for his decision. The points are purely decorative, served no practical purpose, and were often awarded to audience members or other arbitrary third persons. The style of the games are varied (see Games, below). Some feature all four performers, while others feature fewer. The performers who are not involved in a game remain in their seats at the back of the stage. Humorous banter between the host and the performers between games is also sometimes featured.

At the conclusion of each episode, a winner or several winners are chosen arbitrarily by the host. The "prize" for winning the show is to read the credits in a certain style, chosen by the host, as they scrolled.

Episodes were culled down from longer recording sessions with the best game performances chosen to compile into one or more episodes. Each series includes one or two compilation shows of unaired games from different taping sessions in that series.

Games 
The number and type of games played vary from episode to episode, and whilst some games such as "Questions Only" and "Hoedown" became more common over time, others such as "Authors" and "Remote Control" faded from use. New games were created throughout the show's run. Some games, such as "Tag," are based on traditional improv games, while others are uniquely created for the series. Most games consist of a single long skit performed by the chosen performers, but some, such as "World's Worst" and "Scenes from a Hat," are played as a rapid-fire series of short skits.

While all games are designed to test the performer's improvisational skill, some also test other skills, such as singing or doing impressions. Whose Line? features a number of musical games, which feature one or more of the show's resident musicians playing live backing music. Occasionally, pre-recorded music is also used. While they were good sports about it, many of the performers despised the musical games. In one episode, Stephen Fry is asked to perform a rap, and starts to do so halfheartedly, but gives up after a few words, and Ryan Stiles would frequently inject insults into the Hoedown whenever he is forced to sing it, usually pointed at the host or the Hoedown itself. Colin Mochrie would generally speak his lines instead of singing them for musical games.

Some games require suggestions or topics. Depending on the game, these may be solicited directly from the studio audience during the taping, or written down by the audience and/or production staff in advance and then randomly drawn for the performers' use. The host uses a buzzer to signal the end of a game, or of individual sections in the rapid-fire games.

Episodes

DVD release 
The first release of the UK show, featuring the first two series, was released on DVD in America on 27 March 2007 by A&E Home Entertainment, and in the UK on 25 January 2008 by Channel 4. The UK edition is edited to remove references to the ad breaks. Also, British episodes were released on VHS (in the UK only) in the mid-1990s. Additionally, a play-at-home book was printed in 1989, related to the British series.

Almost all of the UK versions (135 of 136 episodes) of Whose Line Is It Anyway? are available for free to those living in the UK on All 4.

Legacy 
After the programme's cancellation by Channel 4 in 1999, Stiles introduced the programme's format to fellow comedian Drew Carey, who took great interest and subsequently pitched an American version of the same name to the ABC TV network with great success. Their pitch was to conduct the same variety of improvisational comedy-styled games as the British original, with Carey hosting the programme, and both Stiles and Mochrie being regular performers. The American format maintained the same style, although with a more notable take on a game show, with both Brady and Proops also working alongside the group in episodes.

On 6 March 2011, over twelve years after the series finale, a special edition of the show was recorded for "24 Hour Panel People", a marathon of UK panel shows, in aid of Comic Relief. The recording was broadcast live on the Comic Relief website at about 9:30am, while the edited compilation shows for the event were shown between 13–17 March on BBC Three. Alongside Anderson hosting the show, the format was adjusted to feature five performers, and featured performances by Humphrey Ker, Josie Lawrence, Neil Mullarkey, Tony Slattery and David Walliams.

In 2017, a stage-version of the show appeared at the Edinburgh Festival Fringe with some members of the original cast. The initial shows were a sell-out and extra dates and shows were put on. Sell-out runs followed at the London Palladium and The Royal Albert Hall. In April 2019, it was announced that the stage-version of the show would be returning to the Edinburgh Festival Fringe, with Tony Slattery returning as one of the original cast members.

See also 
 Mock the Week
 Fast and Loose
 Thank God You're Here
 Kwik Witz
 Improvisation My Dear Mark Watson
 ComedySportz
 Boom Chicago
 The Second City

References

External links 

1980s British satirical television series
1990s British satirical television series
1988 British television series debuts
1999 British television series endings
British panel games
Channel 4 comedy
Channel 4 game shows
1980s British game shows
1990s British game shows
English-language television shows
Improvisational television series
Television series based on radio series
Television series by Hat Trick Productions
Television shows shot at Teddington Studios